Thomas Samuel Grace (16 February 1815 – 30 April 1879) was an English Anglican missionary in New Zealand. He was a member of the Church Missionary Society. He was born in Liverpool, Lancashire, England on 16 February 1815.

Grace replaced William Williams at Tūranga in Poverty Bay from 1850 until 1853, during the latter's trip to Britain. Te Kooti attended the boarding school at Tūranga during the time Grace was in charge of the mission.

He was appointed to Taupo. In 1865 the Pai Mārire ransacked his house. Grace fled from Taupo to Opotiki and was caught up in the Völkner Incident. He was arrested and put on trial by the Pai Mārire party. He was rescued from captivity two weeks later by a British man-of-war, HMS Eclipse, after an attempt by the Pai Mārire to exchange him for Tauranga chief Hori Tupaea, who was in prison. In the 1870s he rebuilt the mission station at Taupo.

Sources
 D. Grace, A Driven Man – Missionary Thomas Samuel Grace 1815-1879: His Life and Letters, Wellington : Ngaio Press, 2004

References

1815 births
1879 deaths
English Anglican missionaries
Clergy from Liverpool
English emigrants to New Zealand
Anglican missionaries in New Zealand